The Tanzania Military Academy (TMA) is a military training academy located in Monduli in northern Tanzania. It is regarded as a  prestigious training institution and has trained officers from a number of countries across the region.

History
The academy was constructed with assistance from the Government of China and was formally inaugurated by President Julius Nyerere in 1976. At inception, it was known as the National Leadership Academy before being renamed its present name in 1992 after the country's transition to a multiparty system. Over the years, it has trained officers from Kenya, Lesotho, Seychelles, South Africa, Zambia and Uganda.

Notable alumni
 Jakaya Kikwete, 1976
 Katumba Wamala
 Elly Tumwine
 Joseph Semwanga
 Makongoro Nyerere
 Yusuf Makamba
 Venance Salvatory Mabeyo
 John Mutwa
 Sam Magara

See also
 Tanzania People's Defence Force

References

External links
 Images of the Tanzania Military Academy
 

 
Military education and training in Tanzania
Military academies